Afroditi Skafida (born 20 March 1982) is a female Greek pole vaulter. She is a four-time outdoor and a three-time indoor champion for Greece.

Skafida represented the host nation Greece at the 2004 Summer Olympics, coincidentally in her home city, where she competed for the women's pole vault. Despite being cheered by her home crowd, she received no marks in the qualifying rounds of the competition, after failing to clear a height of 4.00 metres.

At the 2008 Summer Olympics in Beijing, Skafida improved her performance by successfully clearing the best possible height of 4.30 metres in the women's pole vault. Skafida, however, failed to advance into the final, as she placed sixteenth overall, tying her position with Poland's Joanna Piwowarska and Portugal's Sandra-Helena Tavares.

Competition record

References

External links
 
 
 
 
 

1982 births
Living people
Greek female pole vaulters
Olympic athletes of Greece
Athletes (track and field) at the 2004 Summer Olympics
Survivor Greece contestants
Athletes (track and field) at the 2008 Summer Olympics
Mediterranean Games bronze medalists for Greece
Mediterranean Games medalists in athletics
Athletes (track and field) at the 2005 Mediterranean Games
Athletes from Athens
Survivor Turkey contestants